Styrax crotonoides is a species of plant in the genus Styrax and family Styracaceae. It is found in Peninsular Malaysia and Singapore.

References

crotonoides
Flora of Malaya
Vulnerable plants
Taxonomy articles created by Polbot